Jered Byron Carr is a political scientist, professor of urban policy and a former Policy analyst for the Florida State Legislature in the Office of Program Policy Analysis and Government Accountability.

He was formerly the Director of the L.P. Cookingham Institute of Urban Affairs and Professor of Henry W. Bloch School of Management at University of Missouri-Kansas City and was a former researcher at Center for International Public Management. Presently, he is Co-Editor and Managing Editor of the Urban Affairs Review and Head of the Department in Public Administration  at University of Illinois at Chicago.

Background
Carr earned his Ph.D. degree in public administration from the Askew School at Florida State University where his dissertation, The Political Economy of Local Government Boundary Change: State Laws, Local Actors, and Collection Action, received the 2001 Leonard D. White Award from the American Political Science Association. Previously, he earned an M.A. in economics and B.A. in finance from Florida Atlantic University. Carr taught at Wayne State University and the College of Charleston.

Editor
Carr is co-editor of City-County Consolidation and Its Alternatives: Reshaping the Local Government Landscape (by M.E. Sharpe, 2004, New York City).

He also currently serves as the co-editor of the “Reviews and Essays” section of the State and Local Government Review.
His research has been published in a wide range of journals in public administration and urban affairs, including the American Review of Public Administration, Political Research Quarterly, Public Administration Review, Publius, State and Local Government Review, Urban Affairs Review and Urban Studies.

Selected bibliography

Sources

External links
Jered Carr at UMKC

Living people
21st-century American economists
American political scientists
Florida State University alumni
Florida Atlantic University alumni
University of Missouri faculty
Wayne State University faculty
College of Charleston faculty
Year of birth missing (living people)